J-Star stands for Jungiery Star. Jungiery is a Taiwanese Artiste Management Company.
Members of J-Star are: 5566, 183 Club, 7 Flowers, Typhoon, Taiji, LALA, VJ and Cyndi Wang. R&B and K-One used to be part of J-Star too. Some of the original R&B members left Jungiery, and the remaining members were re-grouped with other Jungiery trainees into bubblegum-pop group LALA. And K-One is now back to Wingman Entertainment.

5566 is the main pillar of J-Star.

Members

Current members
 5566 since 2002
 183 Club since 2004
 7 Flowers  (七朵花) since 2004
 Cyndi Wang (王心凌) since 2003
 Typhoon* since 2004
 Taiji*
 LALA* since 2006
 VJ*
 Magic 1+1 (魔幻1+1) since 2009

Former Members

 R&B* 2003-2006
 K-One 2003-2006

Activity 
J-Star have their own magazine, with the same name, J-Star.

In 2006 they formed a baseball team to play against Playboy (Korea) and Japan.

History
The main manager Sun De Rong (also known as Sun Zhong) first created 5566 (21 January 2002).
Alongside with them, there are individuals like Ming Dao, Qiao En, Cyndi Wang, Hong Qiao.
Almost 2 years later R&B was born (was disbanded in 2006).
From then on, with all the success they have, they started to create more and more groups, like 7 Flowers, 183 Club. The individuals are put into groups as well. 
Sun Zhong took K-One over his side. And Toro moved to Jungiery after he quit Energy and now in a group called Typhoon.

In 2007 they got some step back.

Albums

J-Star Albums

5566 Albums

183 Club Albums
  (Heaven's Wedding Gown) OST (2004)
 The Prince Who Turns Into A Frog OST (2005)
 The Magicians of Love OST (2006)
 FIRST ALBUM (2006)
 Angel Lover OST (2007)

7 Flowers Albums
 7 Flowers (七朵花) (2 November 2005)
 Top On The Forbidden City Original TV Drama Soundtrack (2004)
 The Prince Who Turns Into a Frog Original TV Soundtrack (2005)
 The Magicians Of Love Original TV Soundtrack (2006)

Cyndi Wang Album

Companies of Taiwan
Jungiery